Sesbania sesban, the Egyptian riverhemp, is a species of plant in the legume family.

Synonyms include:

Aeschynomene aegyptiaca (Pers.) Steud.
Aeschynomene sesban L.
Emerus sesban (L.) Kuntze
Sesbania aegyptiaca Poir.

Uses 
Sesbania sesban is a nitrogen-fixing tree and may be useful in alley cropping.

References

Relevant literature
Ramni Jamnadass, Jean Hanson, Jane Poole, Olivier Hanotte, Tony J. Simons, Ian K. Dawson. High differentiation among populations of the woody legume Sesbania sesban in sub-Saharan Africa: Implications for conservation and cultivation during germplasm introduction into agroforestry systems. Forest Ecology and Management Volume 210, Issues 1–3, 2005, Pages 225–238, ISSN 0378-1127, https://doi.org/10.1016/j.foreco.2005.02.033.

External links 

Faboideae
Taxa named by Carl Linnaeus